Vyronas Davos (Greek: Βύρων Δάβος; born 1927), is a Greek historian, writer and poet. He was born in the village of Pelopio in Elis and moved to Athens as an employee of the fire department.  Davos was member of the Hellenic or Greek Literature Company and the Greek Literature Union.  His literature of the same is made known to the cultural ministry.

Bibliography

He wrote several historic and poetic works. His most popular include:

He also wrote several articles in newspapers of Elis including Patris, Avgi, etc.

References

The first version of the article is translated from the article at the Greek Wikipedia (Main page)

1927 births
Living people
People from Elis
20th-century Greek historians
Greek journalists
20th-century Greek poets
Greek male poets
20th-century Greek male writers